Phone sex is a conversation between two or more people by means of the telephone which is sexually explicit and is intended to provoke sexual arousal in one or more participants. All parties participate voluntarily; it is typically accompanied by masturbation. As a practice between individuals temporarily separated, it is as old as dial telephones, on which no operator could eavesdrop (1930s–1950s). In the later 20th century businesses emerged offering, for a fee, sexual conversations with a phone sex worker.

Phone sex takes imagination on both individuals' part, as each party imagines virtual sex. The sexually explicit conversation takes place between two or more persons via telephone, especially when at least one of the participants masturbates or engages in sexual fantasy.

Phone sex conversation may take many forms, including: guided fantasy, sexual sounds, narrated and enacted suggestions, sexual anecdotes and confessions, candid expression of sexual fantasies, feelings, or love, or discussion of personal and sensitive sexual topics.

Once means of transmitting payment were developed, phone sex turned into primarily a commercial activity, with customers and sellers.

As a substitute for physical intimacy 
Phone sex does not involve physical contact between those participating in it. Couples may choose to engage in phone sex when the inconvenience of distance makes physical intimacy impossible.

Due to the potential for emotional intimacy between those who have engaged in phone sex, it is a matter of some debate whether phone sex is to be considered infidelity when involving a person outside of a committed personal relationship. Nevertheless, phone sex should not be confused with prostitution wherein money is exchanged for in-person sexual services or physical interaction.

As a business

Origin
The editor of High Society magazine, Gloria Leonard, is credited with being one of the first people to use "976 numbers", then "900 numbers" for promotional purposes and soon as a revenue stream in the adult industry.  Leonard recorded her own voice informing callers of the contents of the next issue of High Society magazine before its publication. Later she recorded others such as Annie Sprinkle "talking sexy". Leonard convinced magazine owner Carl Ruderman to purchase more of these numbers and the business began to be successful using the magazine to promote the service. Leonard herself was surprised at the success of these numbers.

Operation 
Originally phone sex services consisted of a managed network of dispatchers (live or automated) and erotic performers. Performers would come to a studio where they received a cubicle, coaching, and cash incentives to keep callers on the line longer. This is the world portrayed in Spike Lee's movie about phone sex, Girl 6.  At that time independent phone sex was more dangerous, as Lee's movie portrays.

With the progress of technology it became more practical, convenient, and economical for providers to work out of their homes. Human dispatchers — female, except for gay male phone sex — answered the advertised phone numbers, processed payment via credit card, chose who of the available performers in the dispatcher's judgment best matched the clients' fantasy (grandma, black girl, college girl, etc.), and connected the client with the provider. The caller could not see the performer's number. Either could hang up, though some services put economic pressure on providers not to do so.

Originally, per-minute billing was provided by phone companies (in the U.S., using  976, then 900 numbers). There was, from some services, an attempt to keep the caller aroused but short of orgasm, so he would spend more money. (This attitude still survives among some providers.) When public (mostly female) pressure forced the phone companies to stop providing this service to sex workers, a transition was made to a manual method: pre-paid blocks of time, 10, 30, 60 minutes, whatever the customer would pay for. The incentives for providers were then reversed; rather than earning money from keeping the customer on the line (orgasm delayed), they earned more from bringing the caller to orgasm quickly, so as to move on rapidly to another call. Unused minutes were rarely usable on a second call. The provider provided (say) 10 minutes of service, but got to keep all of the money (say 20 minutes).

When the Internet got relatively mature, sale of any sexual service not involving a minor could be made to anyone not a minor.  Software platforms were custom written to handle money collection and transfer, connecting caller and sex worker though neither could see anything but the platform's phone number, and metering the connection. Details vary significantly from one platform to another, but the provider may be given a personal page on the platform to use however she (sometimes he) wishes. All have some way for a provider to post a picture and some text. Big platforms as of 2016 are Niteflirt, TalktoMe, and My Phone Site; the latter also includes provision by which a manager, with the consent of the providers, could have a virtual shop with many providers under them. Foreign (non-US) customers were courted. Customers had a variety of payment options, and pages of providers to choose from, sometimes with voice samples available. In concept they have a lot in common with platforms such as eBay: the seller provides the picture(s), description, and sets the price, a percentage of which is kept by the platform. In the sex industry, similar platforms emerged facilitating the selling of used panties and other odoriferous garments, and for "cam" video sessions, in which the customer, for a fee, can direct the woman on the video screen, and for a higher fee, have a private connection (no one can see caller or provider except each other).

United States 

By the end of the 1980s, nearly all of the major local phone companies in the United States, plus the major long-distance carriers, were actively involved in the adult chat line business. The telephone companies would provide billing services for chat line companies. Typically the telephone companies would bill callers to chat lines and then remit 45% of the money collected to chat line operators. The telephone companies placed the chat line charges on a customer's local phone bill. If a customer disputed a charge, the telephone company would usually "forgive" the charge but block the caller from calling any other chat lines. In 1988, the American phone sex industry generated an estimated $54 million annually (for both producers and telecommunications providers), according to the Information Industry Bulletin. In the 1990s and into the 2000s American Telnet was one of the largest phone sex companies in the US. 

By 2007 only Verizon, Sprint and AT&T remained in the chat line business in the U.S. By 2007 Verizon and MCI had merged and only a few chat line companies remained active as a result. Verizon provided billing services to calls made in Massachusetts, Rhode Island and Maine. AT&T and MCI offered nationwide collection services, with a cap of $50 per call.

In 2002 profits from phone sex were estimated at one billion dollars a year. In 2007 the group Citizens for Responsibility and Ethics in Washington estimated that phone sex earned U.S. telephone companies close to $500 million per year.

The vast majority of modern services in the United States use toll-free numbers whereby clients can dial up to request a call with a particular performer using credit cards, ACH Network systems, and a variety of other billing methods. There are still some services that rely upon premium-rate telephone numbers (e.g., 976 and 900 numbers) for billing purposes, although this practice has been largely abandoned due to the high rate of fraud associated with these lines and the inability to dial 900 and 976 lines from cellular phones. As a direct result, most telephone companies allow their customers to block outgoing calls to premium-rate telephone numbers. In 1996, the FCC changed regulations on 900 numbers to address abuse of these services by minors and fraud concerns.

Independent phone sex operators engage in self-promotion. This self-promotion can involve a personalized website where the phone sex performer lists their specialties and services, engaging prospects in social media, various methods of advertising (via the traditional methods listed below, or on organized third-party network sites that provide a basic level of privacy for performer and client alike) or surfing of sexually themed chat rooms for interested clients.

Phone sex service providers typically advertise their services in men's magazines, in pornographic magazines and videos, on late-night cable television, and online.  Some phone sex services use state-of-the-art customer acquisition techniques such as active database marketing to reach potential clients. These advertising methods almost invariably target men, the primary consumers of phone sex services.

The major phone sex and adult chat lines spend millions of dollars in advertising every month. Thanks to technology, their marketing departments can track the effectiveness of their advertising campaigns by assigning unique phone numbers to each advertising campaign, regardless if it includes TV, print, online or a combination of all these. Unique numbers might either be toll-free 1-800 numbers or local access numbers in order to accommodate callers who have been targeted in a local advertising campaign. Phone sex services will usually list all the local numbers on their websites. Assigning unique phone numbers to each advertising channel allows phone chat companies to measure not only the number of calls that each channel generates but also the price per call, conversion rate, and return on investment. This information can be further analyzed to determine key insights such as the most and least profitable caller's demographics, best and worst times to advertise and ultimately which advertising channels to invest more in and which ones to cut.

United Kingdom 
Phone sex lines appeared in the UK in the 1980s using premium-rate telephone numbers for adult services with sexual content, with many of the lines playing tape recordings. The phone sex market in the UK was closely linked to the pornographic magazine market, and advertising for such services often provides a vital element of a magazine's revenue. Up to a quarter of the page length of some magazines may be devoted to such advertisements. Advertising in newspapers, which had been common in the 1980s, was ended as a result of regulatory changes in 1994 which restricted advertisements to top-shelf adult magazines. At the same time rules were introduced requiring the user to pro-actively opt-in by requesting a pin number. This dramatically reduced the number of calls, and the proportion of the income generated by premium-rate telephone numbers which was associated with adult services fell from 18% in 1992 to 1% in 1996. During the 1990s many companies began to re-route their traffic abroad in an attempt to circumvent the regulations. The industry took to operating from 40 countries worldwide, commonly Guyana and the Caribbean. In 1995 the income generated in this way was $2 billion. The regulations also led to an increase in the use of live call-back services paid by credit cards, which did not fall under the regulator's jurisdiction because they did not use premium-rate numbers. By 2009 the proportion of the UK population that had used phone sex lines was 45%, according to a survey by Durex. Most phone sex workers are recruited through word of mouth or the internet as the companies are widely forbidden from advertising in mass media. The number of female university students working for phone sex lines in the UK doubled between 2011 and 2013, according to a BBC-commissioned investigation. The industry's regulatory body Phone-paid Services Authority (formerly ICSTIC and PhonePayPlus) monitors and enforces specific community standards in terms of content and price for premium rate numbers.
.

Legality 

The legality of phone sex businesses was challenged by the U.S. Federal government in July 1988 with the passage of the Telephone Decency Act, which made it a crime to use a "telephone ... directly or by recording device" to make "any obscene or indecent communication for commercial purposes to any person," punishable by a $50,000 fine or six months in prison." At the time the Federal Communications Commission (FCC) was responsible for policing 900 numbers for obscenity and indecency.

Sable Communications of California filed suit against the FCC in federal court to overturn the Telephone Decency Act. On July 19, 1988, U.S. District Judge A. Wallace Tashima ruled that "the prohibition against 'indecent speech' on 900-number recordings was unconstitutional, though its ban on 'obscene speech' could stand."

On June 23, 1989, the U.S. Supreme Court ruled that obscene speech, even in commercial telephone calls, was not protected, though indecent speech was. Justice Byron White wrote for the high court's majority

Workers 

A phone sex worker is a type of sex worker, sometimes referred to as a "phone sex operator", "fantasy artist", "adult phone entertainer", "audio erotic performer", as well as various other monikers. The most valued attributes of a phone sex professional are his or her voice, acting  and sexual roleplay skills, along with the experienced ability to discern and respond appropriately to a broad spectrum of customer requests.

Online companies 

Several online companies provide Internet-based phone sex lines. These services enable callers to post profiles of themselves and then engage in VOIP-based and other types of online sex.

See also

 Cybersex
 Chat line
 Erotic talk
 Mobile porn
 Obscene phone call
 Sexting
 Termination rates
 Work-at-home scheme

References

Further reading

External links

Sample Phone Sex Domain Name 1-900-PhoneSex.com
FTC 900-Number Rules - The Federal Trade Commission's comments on the FCC's "rules designed to curb abusive practices in the pay-per-call industry"

Sexual acts
Sex industry
Pornography
Information by telephone
Masturbation
Prostitution